Congratulations I'm Sorry (typeset as Congratulations...I'm Sorry) is the third studio album by the American alternative rock band Gin Blossoms, and the follow-up album to the successful 1992 release New Miserable Experience, released in 1996 by A&M Records. The album was named in reference to the success of 1992's New Miserable Experience, followed closely by the suicide of the former band member Doug Hopkins in 1993.

Reaction to Congratulations I'm Sorry was mixed, with some critics feeling that the music lay too close to the sound of the previous album. One common complaint was that most versions of the album lacked the successful 1995 single "Til I Hear It from You", from the Empire Records soundtrack; however, some editions of the album did contain the track as its final.

The album's title, according to the lead singer Robin Wilson, came from the response band members usually received from people who both wanted to congratulate the band for the success of New Miserable Experience, while then offering apologies for their friend and former band member Doug Hopkins. The album eventually reached platinum status.

Track listing 
 "Day Job" (Scott Johnson, Bill Leen, Phillip Rhodes, Jesse Valenzuela, Robin Wilson) – 3:51
 "Highwire" (Wilson) – 2:24
 "Follow You Down" (Johnson, Leen, Rhodes, Valenzuela, Wilson) – 4:30
 "Not Only Numb" (Rhodes, Wilson) – 3:06
 "As Long as It Matters" (Rhodes, Valenzuela, Wilson) – 4:31
 "Perfectly Still" (Johnson, Leen) – 4:05
 "7th Inning Stretch" – 0:14
 "My Car" (Valenzuela) – 4:17
 "Virginia" (Valenzuela) – 4:02
 "Whitewash" (Leen, Wilson) – 3:19
 "I Can't Figure You Out" (Valenzuela) – 3:18
 "Memphis Time" (Johnson, Valenzuela) – 3:14
 "Competition Smile" (Rhodes, Wilson) – 4:47
 "Til I Hear It from You" (bonus track) (Valenzuela, Wilson, Marshall Crenshaw) – 3:47

There is a hidden track following "Competition Smile".

Excluded songs 
Among tracks excluded from the album are "Seeing Stars", a song written by the lead singer Robin Wilson about the band's ex-lead guitarist Doug Hopkins, and the 1995 hit "Til I Hear It from You". The latter was released as a single (although it is included on the international edition of the album) and can be found on the soundtrack of the movie Empire Records, while the former was included as a B-side on the "Follow You Down" single, along with Wilson's "Idiot Summer" from the soundtrack of Wayne's World 2.

Reception

Reception to the album was mixed. AllMusic reviewer Stephen Thomas Erlewine gave it three stars out of five explaining that "The only fault of Congratulations...I'm Sorry is that it sounds a bit too close to the debut -- there's virtually no difference in terms of style and production." Entertainment Weekly gave the album an extremely negative review, saying "there’s something too generic about the Gin Blossoms."

People magazine called the album "a quick fix for any dark mood", continuing, "the songs are so upbeat they almost conjure sunny summer afternoons."

Personnel 
Gin Blossoms
 Scott Johnson - guitar, background vocals
 Bill Leen - bass guitar, background vocals
 Phillip Rhodes - percussion, drums, background vocals
 Jesse Valenzuela - guitar, vocals
 Robin Wilson - lead vocals, acoustic guitar

Additional personnel
 Art Neville - Hammond organ
 Rick Steff - accordion
 Robbie Turner - pedal steel guitar
 James SK Wān - bamboo flute

Production 
 Producers: Gin Blossoms, John Hampton
 Engineers: Erik Flettrich, John Hampton, Billy Siegle
 Assistant engineer: Billy Moss
 Mixing: John Hampton
 Dave Collins - mastering
 Pre-production: Billy Siegle
 Direction: Bill Graham
 Art direction: Robin Wilson
 Design: Karen Walker, Robin Wilson
 Photography: Danny Clinch, Robin Wilson
 Cover photo: Robin Wilson

Charts

Weekly charts

Year-end charts

Certifications

References 

Gin Blossoms albums
1996 albums
Albums produced by John Hampton (music producer)
A&M Records albums